Chinghiz Torekulovich Aitmatov (as transliterated from Russian; ; 12 December 1928 – 10 June 2008) was a Kyrgyz author who wrote mainly in Russian, but also in Kyrgyz. He is one of the best known figures in Kyrgyzstan's literature.

Life 
He was born to a Kyrgyz father and Tatar mother. Aitmatov's parents were civil servants in Sheker. In 1937, his father was charged with "bourgeois nationalism" in Moscow, arrested, and executed in 1938.

Aitmatov lived at a time when Kyrgyzstan was being transformed from one of the most remote lands of the Russian Empire to a republic of the USSR. The future author studied at a Soviet school in Sheker. He also worked from an early age. At fourteen, he was an assistant to the Secretary at the Village Soviet. He later held jobs as a tax collector, a loader, an engineer's assistant and continued with many other types of work.

In 1946, he began studying at the Animal Husbandry Division of the Kirghiz Agricultural Institute in Frunze, but later switched to literary studies at the Maxim Gorky Literature Institute in Moscow, where he lived from 1956-58. For the next eight years he worked for Pravda. His first two publications appeared in 1952 in Russian: "The Newspaper Boy Dziuio" and "Ашым." His first work published in Kyrgyz was "Ак Жаан" (White rain, 1954), and his well-known work "Jamila" (Jamila) appeared in 1958. In 1961, he was a member of the jury at the 2nd Moscow International Film Festival. In 1971, he was a member of the jury at the 7th Moscow International Film Festival.

1980 saw his first novel The Day Lasts More than a Hundred Years; his next significant novel, The Place of the Skull, was published in 1987. The Day Lasts More than a Hundred Years and other writings were translated into several languages.

In 1994, he was a member of the jury at the 44th Berlin International Film Festival. In 2002 he was the President of the Jury at the 24th Moscow International Film Festival.

Aitmatov suffered kidney failure, and on 16 May 2008 was admitted to a hospital in Nuremberg, Germany, where he died of pneumonia on 10 June 2008 at the age of 79. After his death, Aitmatov's remains were flown to Kyrgyzstan, where there were numerous ceremonies before he was buried in Ata-Beyit cemetery, which he had helped to found and where his father most likely is buried, in Koy-Tash village, Alamüdün District, Chüy Region, Kyrgyzstan.

His obituary in The New York Times characterized him as "a Communist writer whose novels and plays before the collapse of the Soviet Union gave a voice to the people of the remote Soviet republic of Kyrgyz" and adds that he "later became a diplomat and a friend and adviser to the Soviet leader Mikhail Gorbachev."

Work 

Chinghiz Aitmatov belonged to the post-war generation of writers. His output before Jamila
 was not significant, a few short stories and a short novel called Face to Face. But it was Jamila that came to prove the author's work. Seen through the eyes of an adolescent boy, it tells of how Jamila, a village girl, separated from her soldier husband by the war, falls in love with a disabled soldier staying in their village as they all work to bring in and transport the grain crop. Aitmatov's representative works also include the short novels Farewell, Gulsary!, The White Ship, The Day Lasts More Than a Hundred Years, and The Place of the Skull.

Aitmatov was honored in 1963 with the Lenin Prize for Tales of the Mountains and Steppes (a compilation including Jamila, The First Teacher and Farewell, Gulsary!) and was later awarded a State prize for Farewell, Gulsary! Aitmatov's art was glorified by admirers. Even critics of Aitmatov mentioned the high quality of his novels.

Aitmatov's work has some elements that are unique specifically to his creative process. His work drew on folklore, not in the ancient sense of it; rather, he tried to recreate and synthesize oral tales in the context of contemporary life. This is prevalent in his work; in nearly every story he refers to a myth, a legend, or a folktale. In The Day Lasts More Than a Hundred Years, a poetic legend about a young captive turned into a mankurt serves as a tragic allegory and becomes a significant symbolic expression of the philosophy of the novel.

His work also touches on Kyrgyzstan’s transformation from the Russian empire to a republic of the USSR and the lives of its people during the transformation. This is prevalent in one of his work in Farewell, Gulsary! Although the short story touches on the idea of friendship and loyalty between a man and his stallion, it also serves an tragic allegory of the political and USSR government. It explores the loss and grief that many Kyrgyz faced through the protagonist character in the short story.

A second aspect of Aitmatov's writing is his ultimate closeness to our "little brothers" the animals, for their and our lives are intimately and inseparably connected. The two central characters of Farewell, Gulsary! are a man and his stallion. A camel plays a prominent role in The Day Lasts More Than a Hundred Years; one of the key turns of the novel which decides the fate of the main character is narrated through the story of the camel's rut and riot. The Place of the Skull starts off and finishes with the story of a wolf pack and the great wolf-mother Akbara and her cub; human lives enter the narrative but interweave with the lives of the wolves.

Some of his stories were filmed, like The First Teacher in 1965, Jamila in 1969, and Red Scarf (1970) as The Girl with the Red Scarf (1978).

As with many educated Kyrgyzs, Aitmatov was fluent in both Kyrgyz and Russian. As he explained in one of his interviews, Russian was as much of a native language for him as Kyrgyz. Most of his early works he wrote in Kyrgyz; some of these he later translated into Russian himself, while others were translated into Russian by other translators. Since 1966, he was writing in Russian.

Diplomatic career 

In addition to his literary work, Chinghiz Aitmatov was from 1990 to 1993 the ambassador for the Soviet Union -“and then Russia to Belgium and later, for Kyrgyzstan, the European Union, NATO, UNESCO and the Benelux countries.

Major works 

(Russian or Kyrgyz titles in parentheses)
 A Difficult Passage ("Трудная переправа", 1956)
 Face to Face ("Лицом к лицу", 1957)
 Jamila / Jamilia ("Джамиля", 1958)
 in Omnibus edition Tales of the Mountains and Steppes, Progress Publishers (1969).  ("Jamila", translated by Fainna Glagoleva)
 Telegram Books, (2007).  ("Jamilia", translated by James Riordan)
 Duishen / The First Teacher ("Первый учитель", 1962)
in Omnibus edition Short Novels, Progress Publishers (1965). ("Duishen", translated by Olga Shartse)
in Omnibus edition Mother Earth and Other Stories, Faber (1989).  ("The First Teacher", translated by James Riordan)
 Red Scarf (Kyrgyz: "Кызыл Жоолук" / "Kızıl Jooluk", 1963)
 Tales of the Mountains and Steppes ("Повести гор и степей", 1963)
 Progress Publishers (1969). 
 Farewell, Gulsary! ("Прощай, Гульсары", 1966)
 in Omnibus edition Tales of the Mountains and Steppes, Progress Publishers (1969).  (translated by Fainna Glagoleva)
 Hodder & Stoughton Ltd (1970).  (translated by John French)
 Lightning Voiced Manaschi (Kyrgyz: "Чагылган үндүү Манасчы" / "Chaqylgan Unduu Manaschi")
 The White Steamship / The White Ship ("Белый пароход", 1970) 
Hodder & Stoughton (14 August 1972).  ("The White Steamship", translated by Tatyana & George Feifer)
Crown Publishing Group (November 1972).  ("The White Ship", translated by Mirra Ginsburg)
 The Ascent of Mt. Fuji ("Восхождение на Фудзияму", 1973)
 Noonday Press (June 1975). 
 Piebald Dog Running Along the Shore / Spotted Dog Running Along the Seashore (Kyrgyz: "Деңиз Бойлой Жорткон Ала Дөбөт / Deniz Boyloy Jortkon Ala Dobot"; Russian: "Пегий пес, бегущий краем моря", 1977)
 in Omnibus edition Piebald Dog Running Along the Shore and Other Stories, Raduga Publishers (1989). ("Piebald Dog Running Along the Shore", translated by Alex Miller)
in Omnibus edition Mother Earth and Other Stories, Faber (1989).  ("Spotted Dog Running Along the Seashore", translated by James Riordan)
 Cranes Fly Early (Ранние журавли, 1979)
 Imported Pubn (June 1983). 
 The Day Lasts More Than a Hundred Years ("И дольше века длится день", 1980)
 Indiana University Press (1 February 1988). 
 The Place of the Skull ("Плаха", 1987)
 Grove Press (March 1989).  (translated by Natasha Ward)
The time to speak out (Library of Russian and Soviet literary journalism), Progress Publishers (1988). 
Time to Speak, International Publishers (May 1989). 
 Cassandra's Brand ("Тавро Кассандры", 1996)
 When The Mountains Fall ("Когда горы падают", 2006)
 Ode to the Grand Spirit: A Dialogue with Daisaku Ikeda, I.B Tauris (30 April 2009).

References

Works cited

General references

External links 

 An online collection of Aitmatov's works 
 Iraj Bashiri. Chingiz Aitmatov's Corner: Stories by Chingiz Aitmatov and Iraj Bashiri's articles about the writer 
 Biography at SovLit.net
 Articles dedicated to Chingiz Aytmatov (in Russian and Uzbek languages)

1928 births
2008 deaths
20th-century Kyrgyzstani writers
20th-century male writers
20th-century short story writers
21st-century Kyrgyzstani writers
Kyrgyz-language literature
Ambassadors of Kyrgyzstan to the European Union
Russian-language literature
Kyrgyzstani writers
Soviet novelists
Soviet male writers
Soviet short story writers
Ambassador Extraordinary and Plenipotentiary (Soviet Union)
Ambassadors of the Soviet Union to Luxembourg
Heads of mission of Kyrgyzstan to NATO
Permanent Delegates of Kyrgyzstan to UNESCO
Russian-language writers
Heroes of Socialist Labour
Heroes of the Kyrgyz Republic
Lenin Prize winners
Officer's Crosses of the Order of Merit of the Republic of Hungary (civil)
Recipients of the Order of Friendship of Peoples
Recipients of the Order of Lenin
Recipients of the Order of the Red Banner of Labour
Recipients of the USSR State Prize
Maxim Gorky Literature Institute alumni
Deaths from kidney failure
Deaths from pneumonia in Germany